Purana Hala is a small ancient town situated in Hala subdivision of Matiari district in Sindh, Pakistan. Its original name was Murtazabad. The town was founded by Makhdoom Mir Muhammad. Due to inundation from the Indus river, a new town with the same name was founded   called Hala new and the existing town became known as Hala Purano.

References

Populated places in Matiari District
Matiari District